Borborema is a municipality in the state of São Paulo in the Southeast Region of Brazil. The population is 16,164 (2020 est.) in an area of 552 km².

See also
List of municipalities in São Paulo

References

Municipalities in São Paulo (state)